DLJ may be an abbreviation for:
 Dalston Junction railway station, London Overground station, code DLJ
 Distributor Licence for Java
 Donaldson, Lufkin & Jenrette 
 Drive Like Jehu, American 1990s post-hardcore band
 Duke Law Journal